Justice Jordan may refer to:

James Jordan (Indiana judge) (1842–1912), associate justice of the Indiana Supreme Court
Robert H. Jordan (1916-1992), associate justice of the Supreme Court of Georgia

See also
Judge Jordan (disambiguation)